The 2022 SRX race at South Boston  was a Superstar Racing Experience race that was held on June 25, 2022. It was contested over 100 laps on the  oval. It was the 2nd race of the 2022 SRX Series season. Tony Stewart held off Marco Andretti to claim his third SRX Series victory.

Entry list

Heat races 
The heat races were held at 8:00 PM EST. The lineups for the 1st heat were determined by random selection. Following the 1st heat, the field is inverted for the 2nd heat. Points are awarded for each position, and the points set the field.

Heat Race 1

Heat Race 2

Starting Lineup

Race results

Main event

References 

2022 in sports in Virginia
SRX South Boston round
2022 SRX